There are a number of Spanish units of measurement of length or area that are virtually obsolete due to metrication. They include the vara, the cordel, the league and the labor. The units of area used to express the area of land are still encountered in some transactions in land today.

(unit of length)

A  (meaning "rod" or "pole", abbreviation: var) is an old Spanish unit of length. Varas are a surveying unit that appear in many deeds in the southern United States, and varas were also used in many parts of Latin America.

The  and the corresponding unit of area, the square , were introduced in the 19th century to measure Spanish land grants. The  can be seen in many deeds as late as the mid to late 1900s.  is equivalent to 5,645.376 Texan square .

As well, lumber is still measured in Costa Rica using a system based on 4 , or 11 feet, for both round and square wood. With square wood, using inches, the width is multiplied by the depth to get a measurement called , or inches.

(unit of area)
The  ( in West Texas) is a unit of area, used to express an area of land, that is equal to 1 million square . It was used in the archaic system of old Spanish land grants affecting Texas and parts of adjoining states. The  is often used as an approximate equivalent to a quarter-section (that is, one quarter of a square mile of land). It is still encountered in modern real estate transactions.

League (unit of area)
A league can also be a unit of area, used to express the area of land, that is equal to 25 million square . It was used in the archaic system of old Spanish land grants affecting Texas and parts of adjoining states and this use of league is used throughout the Texas Constitution.

The (square) league is still encountered in modern real estate transactions.

Palmo and coto (unit of length)
The palmo ("palm") measured the distance between the tip of the thumb and the tip of the little finger with all fingers splayed.

Local units 

Other units 
 , a unit of volume
 , the fourth part of a 
 , a unit of land measure in Cuba.
 , a unit of volume equivalent to approximately 4.625 L.
 , a unit of length used for measuring depths (similar to the fathom); 7 
 , measure of grain by volume
  (of which there are 12 ) used in Galicia in northwestern peninsular Spain.
  (league), a unit of length
  (ounce), a unit of weight (28 grammes) used for chocolate.
  (inch: 24.5 mm) used in Spain.
 , a unit of weight
 , a unit of land measure in the Philippines.
 , a unit of land measure in Valencia.
 , unit of length equal to

See also
 International System of Units
 Metrication in Guatemala
 Portuguese customary units
 Systems of measurement
 Units of measurement

References

External links
 
 www.sizes.com, "Vara Conversions in 19th Century Spain"
 Rowlett's A Dictionary of Units of Measurement
 Reasonover's Land Measures A Reference to Spanish and French land measures(and their English equivalents with conversion tables) used in North America
 http://www.sizes.com/units/

Systems of units
Obsolete units of measurement
Customary units of measurement
Units of measurement by country